This list of museums in New Mexico is a list of museums, defined for this context as institutions (including nonprofit organizations, government entities, and private businesses) that collect and care for objects of cultural, artistic, scientific, or historical interest and make their collections or related exhibits available for public viewing. Museums that exist only in cyberspace (i.e., virtual museums) are not included.

The list

Defunct museums
 Log Cabin Museum, Las Cruces, moved to Chloride, New Mexico in 2006 and now called the Grafton Cabin; currently unused.
 Million Dollar Museum, White's City, New Mexico, near Carlsbad Caverns, contents auctioned off in 2008, contained oddities and curios
 New Mexico Film Museum, Santa Fe, closed in 2010

See also
 List of museums in the United States
 Nature Centers in New Mexico

References

External links
New Mexico Tourism Department
New Mexico Historical Museums
Full List of New Mexico Cultural Institutions

New Mexico
 
Museums
Museums